The tub gurnard (Chelidonichthys lucerna), also known as the sapphirine gurnard, tube-fish, tubfish or yellow gurnard, is a species of marine ray-finned fish belonging to the family Triglidae, the gurnards and sea robins. It is found in the eastern Atlantic Ocean. It is exploited by commercial fisheries as a food fish.

Taxonomy
The tub gurnard was first formally described as Trigla lucerna in 1758 by Carl Linnaeus in the 10th edition of his Systema Naturae with the type locality given as the "Northern Ocean". In the same publication Linnaeus described Trigla hirundo and in 1896 David Starr Jordan and Barton Warren Evermann designated T. hirundo as the type species of the genus Chelidonichthys, which had been described by Johann Jakob Kaup in 1876. T. hirundo is now treated as a junior synonym of T. lucerna. The specific name lucerna is Latin for "lamp" and was given to the superficially similar, but unrelated, flying gurnard (Dactylopterus volitans), a name reaching back at least as far as Pliny the Elder, who described its fiery red tongue glowing in the night and the name was later used for the tub gurnard or a related species in Liguria and Venice during the Renaissance.

Description
The tub gurnard has a large, bony, triangular shaped head which bears many ridges and spines but which does not have an occipital groove. There are two spiny lobes on the tip of the snout and the eyes are relatively small. The large mouth is set low on the head and the jaws and vomer are covered by densely set rows of teeth. There are two dorsal fins, the first contains 8 to 10 spines and the second 16 or 17 soft rays. The anal fin has between 14 and 16 soft rays. The cleithral spine is short and is located over the pectoral fin and extends just to the first quarter of the pectoral fin. The pectoral fins, typically for gurnards are large with the innermost three rays free from the membrane, thickened and finger-like, used for locomotion and to detect prey. There are no scales present on the breast and front section of the belly, the body has small, well embedded scales while the scales on the lateral line are small and tubular. The caudal fin is slightly emarginate. The overall colour is deep reddish brown to pinkish red, with a pinkish lower body. The blue pectoral fins are spotted green in the centres and red on the margins.

Distribution and habitat
The tub gurnard is found in the Eastern Atlantic Ocean where it occurs from Norway south along the European and African coasts as far south as Ghana. It occurs throughout the Mediterranean Sea and in the Black Sea too. It is absent from Madeira and the Azores but is found around the Canary Islands.

Biology

Diet
The tub gurnard is an opportunistic predatory species which feeds on benthic prey, particularly crustaceans and smaller fishes. The largest part of their diet in a study in the northwestern Mediterranean was crustaceans, mostly Decapoda and especially crabs, with species such as Goneplax rhomboides and Liocarcinus spp. and caridean shrimps in the genus Philocheras, while the fish taken were dominated by European anchovy (Engraulis encrasicolus) and black goby (Gobius niger). Crustaceans were a more important part of the diet in the summer and fishes gained importance during the winter. They are also known to take molluscs and polychaetes. Prey hiding in the substrate may be detected using the sensory organs on the long separate rays of the pectoral fins.

Reproduction
The tub gurnard spawns between May and July in the northern parts of its range, while it runs from November to February off Egypt. The male and female form a distinct pair to spawn. The eggs are pelagic and in the larvae and post larvae all of the pectoral fin rays are contained within the fin membrane.

Vocalisations
Tub gurnards make grunting or growling sounds, using the muscles associated with the swim bladder, these sounds are thought to be used to keep the schools together.

Fisheries
The tub gurnard is targeted by commercial fisheres but the amount caught is relatively low, average declared global landings in 2011 to 2015 were 4429 tonnes. Much of this catch is taken in the North Sea (52%) and the eastern English Channel (37%), however, the actual landings are often described as "gurnard" and are not sorted to species on landing. The tub gurnard, with the red gurnard ( Chelidonichthys cuculus) and the grey gurnard (Eutrigla gurnardus) have been recognised as potential commercial species and this has led to recommendations made by the ICES to monitor landings and discards and to get population biology data to be used to assess the stock. However, this data is lacking in all three exploited gurnard species, particularly the tub gurnard.

Gallery

References

External links
 

tub gurnard
Fish of Europe
Fish of the Mediterranean Sea
Fish of the Black Sea
Fauna of the British Isles
Marine fauna of North Africa
tub gurnard
tub gurnard